The 1978 NCAA Men's Division I Outdoor Track and Field Championships were contested June 1−3 at the 56th annual NCAA-sanctioned track meet to determine the individual and team national champions of men's collegiate Division I outdoor track and field events in the United States. 

This year's meet was hosted by the University of Oregon at Hayward Field in Eugene, Oregon. 

UCLA and UTEP, each with 50 points, tied atop the team standings and were declared co-national champions; it was the Bruins' sixth title and the Miners' second.

Team result 
 Note: Top 10 only
 (H) = Hosts

References

NCAA Men's Outdoor Track and Field Championship
NCAA Division I Outdoor Track and Field Championships
NCAA
NCAA Division I Outdoor Track and Field Championships